A pluralist democracy describes a political system where there is more than one center of power. Modern democracies are by definition pluralist as democracies allow freedom of association. However, pluralism may exist without democracy.
In a democratic society, individuals achieve positions of formal political authority by forming successful electoral coalitions. Such coalitions are formed through a process of bargaining among political leaders and subleaders of the various organizations within the community. It is necessary to form electoral coalitions; this gives the organizational leaders the ability to present demands and articulate the viewpoints of their membership.  Hamed Kazemzadeh, a new generation pluralist from Canada, believes that pluralist democracy means a multitude of groups, not the people as a whole, can govern, direct, lead, and manage societies as an ethic of respect for diversity.

References

External links
"The Political Theory of Pluralist Democracy", article by Claude J. Burtenshaw (The Western Political Quarterly, Vol. 21, No. 4 (Dec., 1968), pp. 577–587, University of Utah)
"Pluralist Democracy", The Portfolio of Hamed Kazemzadeh Perso-Canadian Orientalist and Pluralist.  
"A Pluralist Democracy", article by Göran Rosenberg (Eurozine, 27 November 2001)
"Pluralist Model", article by ThinkQuest Team 26466: Eric Barr, Taylor Rankin, and John Baird (A More Perfect Union project, for students by students)

Democracy
Autonomous Administration of North and East Syria
Political terminology
Types of democracy